The following is a comprehensive discography of Dio, an American heavy metal band led by vocalist Ronnie James Dio. Dio was formed in 1982 after Ronnie James Dio and drummer Vinny Appice left Black Sabbath. The band went through frequent personnel changes. The final line-up consisted of Dio (vocals), Craig Goldy (guitars), Rudy Sarzo (bass), Simon Wright (drums) and Scott Warren (keyboards).

The band's debut album Holy Diver (1983) peaked at number 61 on the Billboard 200 and was certified platinum in the United States. The first single "Holy Diver" charted at 72 in the United Kingdom, followed by "Rainbow in the Dark" which reached 46. Their follow-up album The Last in Line (1984) charted higher, reaching number 24 in the US, and went platinum in the US. The single "Last in Line" peaked at number 10 in the US and became the band's best performing single, while "Mystery" reached 20 and "We Rock" charted at 42 in the UK. Sacred Heart (1985) reached gold status in the US, and was the last Dio album to achieve any sales certifications. The single "Rock 'N' Roll Children" charted at 26 in the UK. In 1987, the band released Dream Evil. The single "I Could Have Been a Dreamer" was the band's last to chart in the US, reaching 33. For Lock up the Wolves, the band released their last chart single "Hey Angel", which reached 94 in the UK. In 2002, the band released Killing the Dragon. It reached 199, and was the last to chart in the US.

Studio albums

Live albums

Compilations

EPs

Singles

Notes:

Videos

References

External links
 Ronnie James Dio Official site
 Tapio's site, a comprehensive Dio discography

Dio (band)
Heavy metal group discographies
Discographies of American artists